The approximately 5,400 railway stations in Germany that are owned and operated by the Deutsche Bahn subsidiary DB Station&Service are divided into seven categories, denoting the service level available at the station.

This categorisation influences the amount of money railway companies need to pay to DB Station&Service for using the facilities at the stations.

Categories

Category 1 

The 21 stations in Category 1 are considered traffic hubs. They are permanently staffed and carry all sorts of railway-related facilities, as well as usually featuring a shopping mall in the station. Most of these stations are the central (commonly referred to as main) stations (Hauptbahnhof or Hbf) of large cities with 500,000 inhabitants and above, though some in smaller cities, such as Karlsruhe Hauptbahnhof, are regarded as important because they are at the junction of important railway lines. Berlin, Hamburg, Munich and Cologne, the four biggest cities in Germany, have more than one Category 1 station.

Included in this category are the following stations:
Berlin-Gesundbrunnen station
Berlin Hauptbahnhof
Berlin Ostbahnhof
Berlin Südkreuz
Dortmund Hauptbahnhof
Dresden Hauptbahnhof
Duisburg Hauptbahnhof
Düsseldorf Hauptbahnhof
Essen Hauptbahnhof
Frankfurt Hauptbahnhof
Hamburg-Altona station
Hamburg Hauptbahnhof
Hannover Hauptbahnhof
Karlsruhe Hauptbahnhof
Köln Hauptbahnhof
Köln Messe/Deutz station
Leipzig Hauptbahnhof
München Hauptbahnhof
München Ost
Nürnberg Hauptbahnhof
Stuttgart Hauptbahnhof

Category 2 
Most of the 87-odd stations in Category 2 are either important junctions for long-distance traffic or offer connections to large airports. InterCity and EuroCity trains generally call at these stations. All railway-related services, like a ticket hall and a service desk, are present at the station and the station is staffed at most times trains are running. The service is similar to Category 1 stations.

Category 2 stations, by state, are:
 Baden-Württemberg (12): Bietigheim-Bissingen, Bruchsal, Freiburg (Brsg) Hbf, Heidelberg Hbf, Heilbronn Hbf, Mannheim Hbf, Offenburg, Plochingen, Pforzheim, Singen, Tübingen Hbf, Ulm Hbf
 Bavaria (10): Aschaffenburg Hbf, Augsburg Hbf, Bamberg, Fürth Hauptbahnhof, Ingolstadt Hbf, Landshut (Bayern), München-Pasing, Regensburg Hbf, Rosenheim, Würzburg Hbf
 Berlin (6): Friedrichstraße, Lichtenberg, Potsdamer Platz, Spandau, Wannsee, Zoologischer Garten
 Brandenburg (3): BER Airport – Terminal 1-2, Cottbus, Potsdam Hbf
 Bremen (1): Bremen Hbf
 Hamburg (2): Hamburg Dammtor, Hamburg-Harburg
 Hesse (8): Darmstadt Hbf, Frankfurt (Main) Süd, Fulda, Gießen, Hanau Hbf, Kassel-Wilhelmshöhe, Kassel Hbf, Wiesbaden Hbf
 Lower Saxony (8): Braunschweig Hbf, Göttingen, Hildesheim Hbf,  Lüneburg, Oldenburg (Oldb) Hbf, Osnabrück Hbf, Uelzen, Wolfsburg Hbf
 Mecklenburg-Vorpommern (1): Rostock Hbf
 North Rhine-Westphalia (17): Aachen Hauptbahnhof, Bielefeld Hbf, Bochum Hbf, Bonn Hbf, Düsseldorf Flughafen, Gelsenkirchen Hbf, Hagen Hbf, Hamm (Westf), Herford, Mönchengladbach Hbf, Münster (Westf) Hbf, Neuss Hbf, Oberhausen Hbf, Paderborn Hbf, Rheine, Solingen Hbf, Wuppertal Hbf
 Rhineland-Palatinate (7): Kaiserslautern Hbf, Koblenz Hbf, Ludwigshafen Hbf, Mainz Hbf, Neustadt (Weinstraße) Hbf, Trier Hbf, Worms Hbf
 Saarland (1): Saarbrücken Hbf
 Saxony (2): Chemnitz Hbf, Dresden-Neustadt
 Saxony-Anhalt (2): Halle (Saale) Hbf, Magdeburg Hbf
 Schleswig-Holstein (4): Bad Oldesloe, Kiel Hbf, Lübeck Hbf, Neumünster
 Thuringia (2): Erfurt Hbf, Weimar

Category 3 
There are 239 Category 3 stations. These stations usually feature a hall where travellers can buy tickets and groceries, but they are not permanently staffed. Often they serve as main stations of towns with about 50,000 inhabitants.

Examples include Görlitz station, Reutlingen, Lichtenfels, Passau Hbf and Mülheim (Ruhr) Hbf.

Category 4 
Category 4 includes around 630 stations. Most of these stations have frequent connections with RegionalExpress and RegionalBahn trains. Their service level is comparable to a bus station and they offer services to commuters. This category also includes stations situated in major cities that see a high usage of S-Bahn or RE/RB services.

Examples include Balingen, Bautzen, Montabaur, Coburg and Munich's S-Bahn stop Isartor.

Category 5 
Category 5 stations (1070) either belong to smaller, rural towns or to outlying suburban areas of major cities. Their inventory is frequently "vandal-proofed" due to their lower passenger numbers. Normally, only local trains call at these stations.

Examples include Sigmaringen, Köln-Holweide and Bremerhaven-Lehe.

Category 6 
Category 6 includes over 2500 stations, with low passenger numbers. Only the most basic equipment needed is present at the station.

Examples of stations in this category include Bad Wimpfen, Loxstedt and Hagen-Vorhalle.

Category 7 
Most of the 870 stations in Category 7, the lowest category, are in rural areas. These stops, which usually have no more than one platform, are served by certain local trains only. Examples of stations belonging to this category include Eggesin and Beuron.

See also
Railway station types in Germany
List of Deutsche Bahn station codes

References

External links 

Railway stations in Germany